Iraq has submitted films for the Academy Award for Best International Feature Film since 2005. The award is handed out annually by the United States Academy of Motion Picture Arts and Sciences to a feature-length motion picture produced outside the United States that contains primarily non-English dialogue. It was not created until the 1956 Academy Awards, in which a competitive Academy Award of Merit, known as the Best Foreign Language Film Award, was created for non-English speaking films, and has been given annually since. , ten Iraqi films have been submitted for the Academy Award for Best Foreign Language Film, and none of them have been accepted as nominees.

Submissions
The Academy of Motion Picture Arts and Sciences has invited the film industries of various countries to submit their best film for the Academy Award for Best Foreign Language Film since 1956. The Foreign Language Film Award Committee oversees the process and reviews all the submitted films. Following this, they vote via secret ballot to determine the five nominees for the award. Below is a list of the films that have been submitted by Iraq for review by the Academy for the award by year and the respective Academy Awards ceremony.

See also
List of Academy Award winners and nominees for Best Foreign Language Film
List of Academy Award-winning foreign language films
Cinema of Iraq

Notes

References

External links
The Official Academy Awards Database
The Motion Picture Credits Database
IMDb Academy Awards Page

Best Foreign Language Film Academy Award submissions by country
Academy Award for Best Foreign Language Film